Line Skak Lindegaard Nielsen (born 6 April 1997) is a Danish handball player who currently plays for Silkeborg-Voel KFUM.

References

1997 births
Living people
People from Ikast-Brande Municipality
Danish female handball players
Sportspeople from the Central Denmark Region